The  Ziban Gedena massacre was a mass extrajudicial killing that took place in Ziban Gedena in the Tigray Region of Ethiopia during the Tigray War, on 4 to 7 December 2020. Ziban Gedena is a village that belongs to woreda Tahtay Adiyabo, northwestern zone of Tigray.

Massacre
The Eritrean Defence Forces (EDF) killed 150 up to 300 civilians in Ziban Gedena (NW Tigray) on 4 to 7 December 2020.

Perpetrators
A UN report indicates that the perpetrators of this massacre were Eritrean soldiers.

Victims
The “Tigray: Atlas of the humanitarian situation” mentions approximately 150 victims of this massacre, whereas a UN report mentions 300 civilian victims. Four victims have been identified.

Reactions
The “Tigray: Atlas of the humanitarian situation”, that documented this massacre received international media attention, particularly regarding its Annex A, that lists massacres in the Tigray War.

After months of denial by the Ethiopian authorities that massacres occurred in Tigray, a joint investigation by OHCHR and the Ethiopian Human Rights Commission was announced in March 2021.

While the Ethiopian government promised that Eritrean troops will be pulled out from Tigray, the Eritrean government denies any participation in warfare in Tigray, let alone in massacres.

For this specific massacre, Eritrean and Ethiopian officials did not respond to questions. Billene Seyoum, spox of the Ethiopian prime minister Abiy Ahmed denied that farmers were prevented from ploughing.

See also 
 Murders and massacres in the Tigray War
Timeline of the Tigray War – December 2020

References

External links
World Peace Foundation: Starving Tigray

2020 in Ethiopia
Conflicts in 2020
Wars involving Eritrea
Wars involving Ethiopia
Massacres in 2020
2020 massacres of the Tigray War
21st-century mass murder in Africa
2020 murders in Ethiopia
Extrajudicial killings in Ethiopia
Mass murder in Africa
History of Ethiopia
Attacks in Ethiopia
December 2020 events in Africa
Massacres committed by Eritrea